The 2024 EHF European Men's Handball Championship will be the 16th edition of the tournament and the third to feature 24 national teams. It will be hosted in Germany from 10 to 28 January 2024.

Bid process

Bidding timeline
The bidding timeline is as follows:
 1 May 2017: Bidding nations to provide official expression of interest in the hosting of the tournament
 1 July 2017: Bidding manuals sent to all bidding federations
 1 November 2017: Deadline for completed bidding and application documentation to be provided to the EHF office
 15 December 2017: Applications to be approved at the EHF executive committee in Hamburg
 20 June 2018: Appointment of host(s) of EHF Euro 2024 at the 14th ordinary EHF Congress in Glasgow, Scotland

Bids
On 4 May 2017, it was announced that the following countries had sent in an official expression of interest:
 ,  & 
  & 
 
 
 

However, when the deadline for submitting the final bids expired, the following applications had been received: 
  & 
  &

Host selection
On 20 June 2018 at the 14th ordinary EHF Congress held in Glasgow, Germany was selected to host the competition.

As Hungary and Slovakia were selected as the 2022 hosts their 2024 bid was withdrawn.

Venues
On 10 June 2021, the host cities were announced that will be played in six cities. The opening game will be held in Merkur Spiel-Arena in Düsseldorf and is aiming to break the world record for the largest attendance at an indoor handball game and the final will be held in Lanxess Arena in Cologne. On 14 September 2022, it was announced that the classic venue Olympiahalle in Munich (previously hosted Handball at the 1972 Summer Olympics main round and medal games and also the group stage games in the 2019 World Men's Handball Championship) would replace the delay-ridden SAP Garden. Due to material and labour shortages, the venue will not be completed in time for the tournament in January 2024, therefore being dropped by the organisers. Both Olympiahalle and the future SAP Garden are located close to each other in the Olympiapark.

Qualification

The qualification for the final tournament will take place between November 2021 and April 2023. Germany as the host team, and the three best placed not already qualified teams from the previous championship, will be automatically qualified, leaving a total of 36 national teams to compete for the remaining 20 places in the final tournament.

The competition consists of two rounds: a relegation round and qualifiers. In the relegation round, the three best placed teams from the 2021 Men's IHF/EHF Trophy joined by Luxembourg as best ranked team according EHF which haven't participated in the second round of the previous qualifiers, will face the four worst ranked fourth-placed teams from the second round of the 2022 qualification. The four winners of the two-legged relegation round matches advance to the qualifiers, joining the remaining twenty teams that participated in the 2022 championship and the remaining eight teams that were eliminated in the second round of the 2022 qualification. Those 32 teams will be divided into eight groups by four teams, with top two teams and four best ranked third-teams qualifying.

Qualified teams

Marketing
The official logo and slogan was unveiled on 6 January 2022. The basis for the logo design is the place where everything is decided in handball and where emotions arise: the lines of the court. Those were transformed into the compact shape of a ball that conveys the dynamics of the sport. The logo was designed by and in collaboration with Berlin-based agency Styleheads. The heart of the communication is the claim "HERE TO PLAY!" This is activated in several variants in order to convey the different facets of the Men's EHF EURO 2024 and the individual locations. The following variations of the claim will be used:

HERE TO PLAY
HERE TO DREAM
HERE TO BE LOUD
HERE TO CELEBRATE
HERE TO RELAX
HERE TO CONNECT
HERE TO ENJOY
HERE TO WATCH
HERE TO EXPLORE.

Draw
The draw will take place on 10 May 2023 in Düsseldorf, Germany.

Preliminary round
The schedule was released on 1 March 2023.

Group A

Group B

Group C

Group D

Group E

Group F

Main round
Points and goals gained in the preliminary group against teams that advance will be transferred to the main round.

Group I

Group II

Knockout stage

Bracket

Semifinals

Fifth place game

Third place game

Final

Final ranking
The teams ranked fourth in each group after the completion of the preliminary round matches will be ranked 18 to 24, while teams ranked third in each group after the completion of the preliminary round matches will be ranked 13 to 18 according to the number of points won in the preliminary round. Places seven or eight will be attributed to the two teams ranked fourth in the groups, places nine and ten to the two teams ranked fifth in the groups, places eleven and twelve to the two teams ranked sixth in the group according to the number of points won by the respective teams after completion of the main round matches. Places one to six will be decided by play–off or knock–out.

Notes

References

External links
Official website

 
European Men's Handball Championship
2024 in handball
2024 in German sport
H
European Men's Handball
European Men's